The 2009–10 Indonesia Super League U-21 Final was a football match which was played on Sunday, 16 May 2010. It was the 2nd final of the Indonesia Super League U-21. The match was played at the Siliwangi Stadium in Bandung and was contested by Persib U-21 of Bandung and Pelita Jaya U-21 from Karawang. For Pelita U-21 this was the second appearance in the final of the ISL U-21 tournament, after consecutive Indonesia Super League U-21 final in 2008-09, with one trophy been won in 2009. Persib U-21 was a debutant of the final stage.

Road to Bandung

Match details

See also
2009–10 Indonesia Super League U-21

References

External links
Indonesia Super League standings (including U-21 ISL)

final